Corentin Henri Le Fur is a French Film score composer and record producer from Beauvais, France, now based in London, United Kingdom. In 2016, Corentin joined the joint venture between British publishing company BMG Rights Management and DJ Fresh production team "The Fallen Angels", then later founded his own company.

Career 
In 2016, Le Fur took part in the writing and production of Digital Farm Animals's breakout single Digital Love as part of DJ Fresh‘s production team “The Fallen Angels”. The success of this single gave him the opportunity to later collaborate with international Artists from Diplo, Fatman Scoop and Kylie Minogue to Bad Company UK and TV Noise.

In 2017, Le Fur contributed to the production of Bad Company UK's Ice Station Zero Album, co-writing and co-producing "Ruckus", a tribute to Pendulum's record : Tarantula.
Later this year, Le Fur started collaborating with the British DJ AFISHAL, helping with the development of the musical part of his Visual DJ project, allowing the DJ to control audio and video assets using a MIDI controller called Tremor.

In 2019, Le Fur's works were featured in Michael Bay’s Motion Picture 6 Underground, as well as Netflix's Next In Fashion. In the following months, he made his way through the music industry as a Film score Composer supplying, among others, compositions for the Video Game editor Epic Games. On the same year, Le Fur was nominated, and won a Mark Award as part of the Production Music Awards ceremony for his work "Venus Bass Trap", as Best Production Music Track in the Hip-Hop/R&B/Urban category.

Discography

Albums 
 2018 : EDM With Attitude (in collaboration with DJ Fresh and Willem Vanderstichele)
 2020 : Galvanised EDM (in collaboration with Andy Garcia)
 2020 : Swagger Riffs 
 2021 : Hype Hop Hitters 
 2021 : Summer Bangers 
 2021 : Future Waves 
 2021 : Hype Hop Hitters vol. 2
 2022 : Glitch Funk vol. 2
 2022 : Rhythmic Intensity vol. 2
 2022 : Boombox Brass Hop
 2022 : Hot Summer

Credits 
 2017 : Digital Farm Animals & Hailee Steinfeld - Digital Love (writer, producer)
 2017 : Bad Company UK - Ruckus (ft. MC $pyda) (writer, producer)
 2018 : Afishal - Alliance (writer, producer)
 2018 : Afishal - Attitude (writer, producer)
 2019 : Afishal - Twerk It (writer, producer)
 2020 : Afishal - Sax in Jamaica (writer, producer)
 2021 : A.R.T - Sail Away (writer, producer)
 2021 : A.R.T - In The Middle feat. Sam Bosman (writer, producer)

Awards and honors
 Mark Award as Best Production Music Track in the Hip-Hop/R&B/Urban - Production Music Awards 2019 for the work Venus Bass Trap<ref>

References 

1996 births
21st-century French composers
Living people
Video game composers
French record producers
Male television composers
Musicians from London
French songwriters
French audio engineers